KPMD (91.9 FM, Pilgrim Radio) is a radio station broadcasting a Christian radio format. Licensed to Evanston, Wyoming, United States, the station is currently owned by Western Inspirational Broadcasters, Inc. KPMD broadcasts from Medicine Butte, northeast of Evanston.

History
The station went on the air as KCWW on August 25, 1999, and aired a public radio format under the ownership of Community Wireless of Park City, Inc. The station was sold to Western Inspirational Broadcasters, Inc. on August 1, 2011, at which point the station adopted its current Christian format. The station's callsign was changed to KPMD on August 3, 2013.

References

External links

 

PMD
Radio stations established in 1999
1999 establishments in Wyoming